Oak Tree is a small village in the borough of Darlington and the ceremonial county of 
County Durham, England. It is situated between Darlington and Eaglescliffe, north of the River Tees. It has a public house and is close to Teesside International Airport.

Geography

Administration
Oak Tree was historically and ceremonially located in County Durham, but for administrative purposes is located in the borough of Darlington (borough), which became a unitary authority on 1 April 1997. Until that date Oak Tree was administered as part of County Durham, along with the rest of the borough, and continues to share police and fire services with the county.

Oak Tree is located in the Middleton St George ward of Darlington, which as of 2005 is represented on the Borough Council by Doris Jones and Bill Maybrey (both Conservative). It is part of the Sedgefield parliamentary constituency, which is represented by Paul Howell (Conservative).

The local police force is Durham Constabulary. Oak Tree is in the Darlington division.

Location
 
 Latitude and longitude:  (54.52, −1.45)
 Elevation: 40 m (130 feet)
 Road access: A67 between Darlington and Egglescliffe passes directly to the north
 Rail access: Dinsdale, 
 Nearest large village: Middleton St George, 
 Nearest town: Darlington,

External links
Aerial photograph from Multimap

Villages in County Durham
Places in the Borough of Darlington
Places in the Tees Valley